Kanaginahal is a village in the Gadag district of Karnataka State in India. The first co-operative society of India was registered in 1905 at Kanaginahal village.

Sri Narayana Temple
Gadag is famous for the Sri Narayana Temple built during the Chalukyan Empire. And also there is Sharanabasweshwar temple, which is also known as 2nd Kalaburgi.

Co-operative movement
The first co-operative movement in Asia was started here in Kanaginahal. Under the leadership of Sri Siddanagouda SannaRamanagouda Patil (1843–1933) The Agricultural Credit Cooperative Society of Kanaginahal was launched in Kanaginahal on 8 July 1905 with the initial sum of two thousand rupees. It was the first of its kind in Asia. Initial work taken up by the Credit Cooperative Society was building Railway Station in the village and providing safe drinking water facility to the villagers.

See also
 Lakkundi
 Timmapur, Gadag
 Harlapur, Gadag
 Harti (Gadag district) 
 Gadag

References

Villages in Gadag district
Western Chalukya Empire
Chalukya dynasty